William Mayne was a British children's fiction writer.

William Mayne may also refer to:
William Mayne, 1st Baron Newhaven (1722–1794), MP for Canterbury, Carysfort and Gatton
William Mayne (Australian politician) (1808–1902), New South Wales politician
William Mayne (officer) (1818–1855), English army officer in the service of the East India Company
William Cyril Mayne (1877–1962), English clergyman and classical scholar